B K Thelma commonly known as Bittianda Kuttapa Thelma is a professor in the Department of Genetics at the University of Delhi, South Campus, New Delhi, India. She is the Principal investigator and Co-ordinator of the Centre of excellence on Genomes Sciences and Predictive Medicine funded by the Govt. of India. She is also the Co-ordinator of a major project on newborn screening for inborn errors of metabolism in Delhi state which aims to demonstrate the feasibility of mandatory screening of newborns in the country and to generate epidemiological data for the testable IEMs in the genetically distinct Indian population, for the first time.

Discovery genomics is the major thrust of her research and ongoing projects include genetic analysis of complex traits including brain and inflammatory disorders and Mendelian forms of neurological and neuropsychiatric diseases. Her most recent engagement is in the area of Ayurgenomics wherein individuals can be deep phenotyped based on the principles of Ayurveda to obtain homogeneous case-control cohorts to be used for disease gene mapping. This approach is expected to overcome the issue of clinical/phenotypic heterogeneity which is a major limitation in contemporary complex trait genetics research.

Research
Her recent academic accomplishments include 
i) identification of novel risk genes/loci for two inflammatory conditions namely Rheumatoid arthritis & Ulcerative colitis by the first ever GWAS conducted in the genetically distinct north Indian population; 
ii) discovery of new causal genes namely MID2 for X-linked Intellectual Disability; PODXL and RIC3 genes for familial Parkinson's disease by exome sequencing approach; and 
iii) demonstration of differences/similarities between the two major Indian subpopulations namely south and north Indians using both SNP array based and exome sequencing approaches. 
She has several national and international collaborative projects and has over 90 peer reviewed publications to her credit. She is a fellow of all the three science academies in India, has served as a member of the Scientific Advisory Council to the Prime Minister of India; National Science and Engineering Research Board and Human Genetics/Medical genomics task force of funding agencies including the Department of Biotechnology and Indian council of Medical research, Government of India. Delhi. She has taught subjects like Human Genetics, Human and Medical Biotechnology, Cytogenetics, Recombinant DNA technology, Prokaryotic and Eukaryotic gene expression, Molecular systematics and evolution, and Cell biology. Her recent publication, Attempts to replicate genetic associations with schizophrenia in a cohort from north India was published in Nature. As of Dec 2019, she has 5135 citation on google scholar, with an h-index of 34 and i10 index of 77.

Education and Career
Thelma completed her BSc and MSc in zoology from Bangalore University in 1973 and 1975 respectively. She pursued PhD in biomedical research in 1982 from the University of Delhi. Thelma had a short stint as postdoctoral fellow in the Human Genetics Laboratory at Children's Hospital, Switzerland with Professor Hans Jakob Muller. She was CSIR Pool Officer and Research Associate in the Zoology Department, University of Delhi. In 1987, she started as a lecturer at Department of Genetics, University of Delhi South Campus. She has also been a visiting scientist at prestigious institutions abroad and undertook several international research collaborations. Thelma established the DNA-based diagnosis facilities for fragile X syndrome, the most common form of inherited intellectual disability, with financial support from Department of Biotechnology. Her lab is one of the few which offers this national level diagnostic service. She also served on various expert committees of ICMR, DBT, and CSIR. and as Member of the XV International Genetics Congress Trust. Thelma has worked on 197 publications as of Dec 2019 according to her google scholar page.

Areas of specialisation and interests

Thelma has extensively worked on Human genetics and Medical genomics. Her areas of specialisation and interest include:

 Molecular genetic analysis of complex disorders in humans (Schizophrenia, Parkinson's disease, Rheumatoid arthritis, Inflammatory bowel disorders)
 Pharmacogenetics of commonly used antipsychotic, anti-Parkinsonian, anti-rheumatoid drugs
 Identification of new gene(s) for X-linked intellectual disability and Parkinson's disease
 Unraveling genome signatures with implication for diseases
 Functional genomics: Genotype-phenotype correlations
 Diagnostic genetics

Awards and honours

Thelma has been recognised for her work. She has received many awards, some of her accomplishments are:

 Member of International Commission on the Clinical Use of Human Germline Genome Editing, Washington DC, USA, 2019
 The Sanghvi Oration Award, Indian Society of Human Genetics, 2015
 The Sunder Lal Hora Medal, Indian National Science Academy, 2014 
 Stree Shakti Science Samman, 2012
 J.C. Bose Fellow, Department of Science & Technology, India, 2011
 Member, Scientific Advisory Committee to Prime Minister, Govt. of India, 2009
 Fellow of Indian National Science Academy, India, Delhi, 2009
 Fellow of the Indian Academy of Sciences, Bangalore, 2006 
 Fellow of National Academy of Sciences (India), Allahabad, 2003 
 Fogarty International Research Career Award, 1997 
 Vice President of the Indian Society of Cell Biology.

References

Articles created or expanded during Women's History Month (India) - 2014
Living people
Indian women academics
Indian women biologists
20th-century Indian biologists
1955 births
Academic staff of Delhi University
Bangalore University alumni
Indian geneticists
Women geneticists
Scientists from Bangalore
20th-century Indian women